Binde is a department or commune of Zoundwéogo Province in central Burkina Faso.

Towns and villages
Binde is the capital of the department.

References

Departments of Burkina Faso
Zoundwéogo Province